Salyan District, a part of Karnali Province, is one of the seventy-seven districts of Nepal. The district's administrative center is named Salyan or Salyan Khalanga, today it is part of Shaarada Municipality.

The district is known for its Hindu temples including Shiva temples in Chhayachhetra and Laxmipur, and the Devi temple at Khairabang in Shaarada municipality, one of nine in Nepal.

History 
Salyan was one of the Baise Rajya, a confederation of 22 petty kingdoms in the Karnali (Ghagra) region. About 1760 CE all these kingdoms were annexed by the Shah Dynasty during the unification of Nepal.

Etymology
Salyan derives from the Nepali word sallo which means pine tree or conifer.

Geography and climate
Although Salyan is considered a hilly district, its southwest salient is actually outside the Pahari-inhabited hill region, in the lower Siwalik Hills that are more an extension of the Terai.

The Babai River flows through the southwestern Siwaliks section after draining Dang Valley. A tributary Sharad Khola drains the eastern half of Salyan's hill region—including the district center, then exits these hills by cutting through the Mahabharat Range to its confluence with the Babai. The western half of Salyan's hill region is drained by the Bheri.

Demographics
At the time of the 2011 Nepal census, Salyan District had a population of 242,444.

As first language, 99.4% spoke Nepali, 0.3% Magar, 0.1% Newar, 0.1% Urdu and 0.1% other languages.

Ethnicity/caste: 57.1% were Chhetri, 15.1% Magar, 11.8% Kami, 3.5% Sanyasi/Dasnami, 3.5% Thakuri, 3.0% Damai/Dholi, 2.6% Hill Brahmin, 1.8% Sarki, 0.6% Newar, 0.3% Badi, 0.1% Gaine, 0.1% Gurung, 0.1% Kumal, 0.1% Musalman, 0.1% other Terai and 0.1% others.

Religion: 97.7% were Hindu, 1.3% Christian, 0.8% Buddhist, 0.1% Muslim and 0.1% others.

Literacy: 63.9% could read and write, 3.5% could only read and 32.5% could neither read nor write.

Population by census 1971–2021#

Administration
The district consists of ten municipalities, out of which three are urban municipalities and sevenare rural municipalities. These are as follows:
 Shaarda Municipality
 Bagchaur Municipality
 Bangad Kupinde Municipality
 Kalimati Rural Municipality
 Tribeni Rural Municipality
 Kapurkot Rural Municipality
 Chatreshwari Rural Municipality
 Kumakh Rural Municipality
 Siddha Kumakh Rural Municipality
 Darma Rural Municipality

Former Village Development Committees 
Prior to the restructuring of the district, Saylan District consisted of the following municipalities and Village development committees:

Badagaun
Bafukhola
Bajh Kanda
Bame Banghad
Bhalchaur
Chande
Chhayachhetra
Damachaur
Dandagaun
Darmakot
Devasthal
Jhajhari Pipal
Dhakadam
Dhanwang
Hiwalcha
Jhimpe
Jimali
Kabhrechaur
Kajeri
Kalagaun
Kalimati Kalche
Kalimati Rampur
Kavra
Khalanga
Korbang Jhimpe
Kotbara
Kotmala
Kubhinde
Laxmipur
Lekhpokhara
Majh Khanda
Marke
Marmaparikanda
Mulkhola
Nigalchula
Phalawang
PipalNeta
Rim
Saijuwal Takura
Sarpani Garpa
Sibaratha
Siddheswar
Sinwang
Suikot
Syanikhal
Tharmare
Tribeni

Maps
Besides the United Nations/Nepal map of districts and VDCs shown above, their Map Centre has a downloadable PDF version adding municipalities, roads and water detail:

From 1992 to 2002 a definitive series of large scale topographic maps were surveyed and published through a joint project by Government of Nepal Survey Department and Finland's Ministry for Foreign Affairs contracting through the FinnMap consulting firm. Japan International Cooperation Agency substituted for FinnMap in Lumbini Zone.
Topographic sheets at 1:25,000 scale covering 7.5 minutes latitude and longitude map the Terai and Middle Mountains. Less populated high mountain regions are on 15 minute sheets at 1:50,000. JPG scans can be downloaded here: These sheets cover Salyan District:

2881 08D Bajedichaur (1999)
2881 11D Chisapani Mulatati (1997)
2881 12A Mehelkuna (1999)
2881 12B Botechaur (1999)
2881 12C Ghuiyabari (1998)
2881 12D Baluwa (1998)
2881 16A Dhakeri (1997)
2881 16B Dhobaghat (1997)
2882 05A Karkigau (1999)
2882 05C Salli Bajar (1999)
2882 05D Swikot (1999)
2882 06C Pharulachaur (1999)
2882 06D Simruth (1999)
2882 09A Kubhinde Daha (1999)
2882 09B Khalanga (1999)
2882 09C Suketal (1999)
2882 09D Shitalpati (1998)
2882 10A Tharmare (1999)
2882 10B Sukhaodar (1999)
2882 10C Luham (1998)
2882 10D Nerpa (1999)
2882 13A Hamsapur (1998)
2882 13B Panchakule (1998)
2882 14A Tulsipur (1999)
2882 14B Dubrin (1999)

References

External links

Districts of Nepal established during Rana regime or before
Districts of Karnali Province